The Taman Universiti MRT station is a future provisional Mass Rapid Transit (MRT) station. When constructed, it would serve the nearby Taman Universiti Indah in Seri Kembangan, Selangor, Malaysia and serve as one of the stations on Klang Valley Mass Rapid Transit (KVMRT) Sungai Buloh-Serdang-Putrajaya Line. The station will be built on the side of Jalan Putra Permai, nearby the National Hydraulic Research Institute of Malaysia building.

References

External links 
 Klang Valley Mass Rapid Transit website
 MRT Hawk-Eye View

Rapid transit stations in Selangor
Proposed rail infrastructure in Malaysia
Proposed railway stations in Asia